Nationality words link to articles with information on the nation's poetry or literature (for instance, Irish or France).

Events
Louis Zukofsky edits the February issue of Poetry magazine. The issue eventually will be recognized as the founding document of the Objectivist poets. It features poetry by Zukofsky, Charles Reznikoff, Carl Rakosi, George Oppen, Basil Bunting, William Carlos Williams, Kenneth Rexroth, and many others. Also in the issue: Zukofsky's essay "Sincerity and Objectification".
 George Oppen and his wife, Mary Oppen found To Publishers in Le Beausset, France; Louis Zukofsky is editor.
 Beacon magazine founded in Trinidad (lasts until 1933)

Works published in English

Canada
Wilson MacDonald, A Flagon Of Beauty. Toronto: Pine Tree Publishing.
Marjorie Pickthall, The Naiad and Five Other Poems (Toronto: Ryerson)

India, in English
 A.R. Chida, editor, An Anthology of Indo-Anglian Verse with an Introductory Note to Each Set of Selections, Hyderabad: A. R. Chida, 113 pages; anthology; Indian poetry in English

United Kingdom
 John Betjeman, Mount Zion; or, In Touch with the Infinite
 Laurence Binyon, Collected Poems
 Edmund Blunden:
 Themis
 (editor) The Poems of Wilfred Owen
 Robert Bridges, Shorter Poems
 Roy Campbell, The Georgiad, a satire openly attacking the Bloomsbury Group; a South African native published in the United Kingdom
 C. Day-Lewis, From Feathers to Iron
 T. S. Eliot:
 Coriolan
 Triumphal March
 John Gawsworth
 Confession: verses
 Fifteen Poems: Three Friends
 Snowballs
 Robert Graves, Poems 1926–1930
 Aldous Huxley:
 The Cicadas, and Other Poems
 The World of Light; A comedy, a verse drama performed March 30
 John Lehmann, A Garden Revisited, and Other Poems
 Æ, pen name of George William Russell, Vale, and Other Poems
 Osbert Sitwell, The Collected Satires and Poems
 William Soutar, Conflict
 Arthur Symons, Jezbel Mort, and Other Poems (sic)
 Humbert Wolfe, Snow

United States
 Franklin P. Adams, Christopher Columbus
 Conrad Aiken:
 The Coming Forth by Day of Osris Jones
 Preludes for Memnon
 E. E. Cummings, W (ViVa)
 Hilda Doolittle (H.D.), Red Roses for Bronze
 Langston Hughes, The Negro Mother
 Edna St. Vincent Millay, Fatal Interview
 Ogden Nash:
 Free Wheeling
 Hard Lines
 Dorothy Parker, Death and Taxes
 Edward Arlington Robinson, Mathias at the Door
 Wallace Stevens, Harmonium, including "Le Monocle de Mon Oncle", "The Comedian as the Letter C", "The Emperor of Ice Cream", "Thirteen Ways of Looking at a Blackbird", "Peter Quince at the Clavier", "Sunday Morning", "Sea Surface Full of Clouds" and "In the Clear Season of Grapes"), Knopf, revised from 1923 edition
 Mark Van Doren, Jonathan Gentry
 Yvor Winters, The Journey
 Gamel Woolsey, Middle Earth

Other in English
 Norman Cameron, Guianese Poetry: 1831–1931
 Kenneth Slessor, Harley Matthews and Colin Simpson, Trio: A Book of Poems, Sydney: Sunnybrook Press, Australia
 Gertrude Stein, Before the Flowers of Friendship Faded Friendship Faded: written on a poem by Georges Hugnet, American poet published in France

Works published in other languages

France
 Guillaume Apollinaire, pen name of Wilhelm Apollinaris de Kostrowitzky, Le condor et le morpion, posthumously published (died 1918)
 Louis Aragon:
 Hourra l'Oural, influenced by the author's conversion to Marxism
 Persécuté Persécuteur
 André Breton, L'union libre
 Francis Jammes, L'Arc-en-ciel des amours, Paris: Bloud et Gay
 Pierre Jean Jouve, Les Noces
 Tristan Tzara, pen name of Sami Rosenstock, L'Homme approximatif

Indian subcontinent
Including all of the British colonies that later became India, Pakistan, Bangladesh, Sri Lanka and Nepal. Listed alphabetically by first name, regardless of surname:

 Atul Prasad Sen, Gitigunja, complete collection of songs by this Bengali poet and composer
 Bal Krisna Rav, Kaumudi, Indian, Hindi-language
 Bhagavadacharya, Mohanapancadhydyi, Sanskrit poem on Mahatma Gandhi
 Chanda Jha, Candra Padyavali, edited by Baladev Mishra, Maithili
 D. K. Kelkar, Kavyalocan, a treatise in Marathi on literary theory; discusses the nature of poetry, figures of speech, the nature of poetic pleasure and Indian literary concepts
 K. V. Simon, Veda Viharam, long poem based on the book of Genesis; India, Malayalam language
 Mahjoor, Nav Baharo Myani Locaro Ho, Kashmiri
 Mayadhar Mansinha, Dhupa, poems in this collection remained very popular as of the mid-1990s; Oriya
 Mohan Singh Diwana, Jagat Tamasa, Punjabi (a 1927 novel by Charan Singh Sahid has the same title)
 Raja K. K., Baspanjali, Malayalam work by a poet of the Vallathol school
 Siyaram Sharan Gupta, Atmostsarga, on the self-sacrifice of Ganesh Shankar Vidyarthi in the cause of communal peace; Hindi
 Tallapragada Visvasundaramma, Ratri, including many patriotic poems; Telugu
 Umashankar Joshi, Vishwashanti, also spelled "Visvasanti" (Indian, writing in Gujarati)
 V. Seetharamayya, Gitagalu, the author's first book of poetry, with navodaya lyrics more intellectual than most; Kannada

Spanish language

Spain
 Federico García Lorca, Poema del cante jondo ("Poem of Deep Song")
 Pedro Salinas, Fábula y signo ("Fable and Sign")
 José Moreno Villa, Carambas

Latin America
 Enrique Peña Barrenechea, Cinema de los sentidos puros, Peru
 Vicente Huidobro, Altazor, Chilean poet published in Spain

Other languages
 Vladimir Mayakovsky, Кем Быть (Kem byt'?, "Whom Shall I Become?"), Soviet Russia, published posthumously, for children
 Giorgos Seferis, Στροφή ("Strophe") (Greece)

Awards and honors
 Pulitzer Prize for Poetry: Robert Frost: Collected Poems

Births
Death years link to the corresponding "[year] in poetry" article:
 January 6
 Juan Goytisolo (died 2017), Spanish poet, essayist and novelist
 P. J. Kavanagh (died 2015), English poet, lecturer, actor and broadcaster
 January 14 – Ahmed Faraz, pseudonym of Syed Ahmad Shah (died 2008), Pakistani Urdu-language  poet, son of Agha Syed Muhammad Shah Bark Kohati, a leading traditional poet
 February 2 – Judith Viorst, American author known for her children's books and poetry
 February 16 – Makoto Ōoka 大岡信 (died 2017), Japanese poet and literary critic
 April 9 – Gerard Benson (died 2014), English poet
 April 15 – Tomas Tranströmer (died 2015), Swedish writer, poet and translator
 April 19 – Etheridge Knight (died 1991), African-American poet
 May 2 – Ruth Fainlight, American poet, short story writer, translator and librettist
 May 16 – Peter Levi (died 2000), English poet, professor of poetry at the University of Oxford, Jesuit priest, archaeologist, travel writer, biographer, scholar, prolific reviewer and critic
 May 27 – O. N. V. Kurup (died 2016), Indian, Malayalam-language poet
 June 5 – James Fenton (died 2021), Northern Irish Ulster Scots dialect poet
 June 6 – Kiki Dimoula, Greek poet (died 2020)
 June 7 – Okot p'Bitek (died 1982), Ugandan poet
 June 13 – Jay Macpherson (died 2012), Canadian lyric poet and scholar; she is a member of the "mythopoeic school of poetry"
 June 21 – Patricia Goedicke (died 2006), American poet
 July 29 – C. Narayana Reddy (died 2017), Indian poet
 July 28 – Alan Brownjohn, English poet and novelist
 August 11 – Delia Domínguez (died 2022), Chilean poet
 September 30 – Jansug Charkviani (died 2017), Georgian poet and politician
 November 8 – Jack Collom (died 2017), American poet
 December 15 – Shuntarō Tanikawa 谷川 俊太郎, Japanese poet and translator (surname: Tanikawa)
 Unknown date – Sonja Dunn, Canadian poet

Deaths
Birth years link to the corresponding "[year] in poetry" article:
 March 16 – Harold Edward Monro, 54, British poet, the proprietor of the Poetry Bookshop in London
 March 31 – Puran Singh (born 1881), Indian, writing Indian poetry in English
 April 2 – Katharine Tynan, 70 (born 1861), Irish poet, novelist and writer who, after her marriage in 1898, usually wrote under the names "Katharine Tynan Hinkson", "Katharine Tynan-Hinkson" or "Katharine Hinkson-Tynan"
 April 10 – Khalil Gibran, 48, poet artist, and writer born in Lebanon who spent much of his productive life in the United States
 November 19 – Xu Zhimo, 34 (born 1897), Chinese poet, in aviation accident
 December 5 – Vachel Lindsay (Nicholas Vachel Lindsay), 42 (born 1879), American poet and early advocate of jazz poetry, a suicide by poison

See also

Poetry
 List of poetry awards
 List of years in poetry
 New Objectivity in German literature and art
 Oberiu movement in Russian art and poetry

Notes

20th-century poetry
Poetry